Ironside is a Universal television series that ran on NBC from September 14, 1967, to January 16, 1975. The series starred Raymond Burr as a paraplegic Chief of Detectives, Robert T. Ironside. Ironside consists of a movie-length pilot, eight seasons of episodes, and a reunion TV-movie.

Series overview
At present, the first four seasons have been released on DVD by Shout! Factory.

Pilot movie (1967)

Episodes

Season 1 (1967–68)

Season 2 (1968–69)

Season 3 (1969–70)

Season 4 (1970–71)

Season 5 (1971–72)

Season 6 (1972–73)

Season 7 (1973–74)

Season 8 (1974–75)

TV Movie (1993)

See also
 List of The Bold Ones: The New Doctors episodes – includes Part 2 of "Five Days in the Death of Sergeant Brown"

References

External links 
 
 

Lists of American crime drama television series episodes